Marano Equo is a  (municipality) in the Metropolitan City of Rome in the Italian region of Latium, located about  east of Rome. It stands on a steep slope descending to the Aniene valley with the Monti Simbruini located nearby.

References

Cities and towns in Lazio